The Lake George Monster, fittingly named "Georgie", was a hoax invented by painter Harry Watrous after a fishing bet with newspaper editor Colonel William d'Alton Mann in 1904. The monster was purportedly sighted at Hague Bay in Lake George in New York, United States. This was a reported solution to an ongoing rivalry that Watrous had with another resident (Colonel Mann). After word had spread about, Watrous began to move the monster around the lake for more publicity. The monster was also sighted at The View restaurant, near Hague.

The original monster is currently on display at the Clifton F. West Historical Museum in the Hague Town Hall in Hague, New York. A replica monster can be found at the Lake George Historical Museum in Lake George, New York.

Origin
According to Mysteries at the Monument, Harry Watrous and Colonel William Mann were avid fishermen, and the two decide to see who can catch the biggest trout in the lake. When Mann showed Watrous a 40-pound whopper he had just caught, he knew he wasn't going to catch anything bigger and realized he had lost the bet. However, days later, Watrous discovers he had been pranked, Mann had ordered a fake fish, and from a distance it looked real. Watrous then decides to get even; he would scare the colonel, and using a 10-foot-long cedar log, he builds a bizarre-looking creature. It has bright red fangs, large eyes, a massive open mouth with a long tongue and strands of whiskers made from hemp rope. Watrous then threaded a 100-foot-long rope through an anchor at the bottom of the lake and through a pulley at the end of the log the monster rested on. So by tugging on the rope, he is able to make the monster rise up out of the water at will. Watrous pulled his friendly prank over and over, sparking the frenzy of sightings all those years ago before abandoning the gag for good. But 30 years later, Watrous revived his monster with the intent of revealing his secret as a practical joke.

References

External links
 
 

Hoaxes in the United States
1900s hoaxes
1904 in the United States